Cloke is a surname. Notable people with the surname Cloke include:
 Cameron Cloke, Australian rules football player
 David Cloke, Australian rules football player and father of Travis, Cameron and Jason Cloke
 Geoffrey Cloke, British chemist
 Hannah Cloke, English hydrologist
 Jason Cloke, Australian rules football player
 Kristen Cloke, American actress
 Travis Cloke, Australian rules football player

See also
 Cloake